Checkerboard and Playing Cards is an early 20th century drawing by Spanish cubist Juan Gris. Done in gouache, graphite, and resin on wove paper, the drawing depicts a table set with a checkerboard and playing cards. Gris' work is in the collection of the Metropolitan Museum of Art.

References 

1915 drawings
Drawings of the Metropolitan Museum of Art
Paintings by Juan Gris